Bambusa dissimulator is a species of bamboo from Hong Kong. It is fast growing and has plentiful branches.

Distribution 

References

dissimulator